Block Island State Airport  is a public use airport located on Block Island, in Washington County, Rhode Island, United States. The airport is owned by the State of Rhode Island. It is primarily a general aviation airport, but there is also scheduled airline service to Westerly State Airport. The airport opened in 1950.

As per Federal Aviation Administration records, the airport had 10,384 passenger boardings (enplanements) in calendar year 2008, 8,516 enplanements in 2009, and 9,821 in 2010. It is included in the Federal Aviation Administration (FAA) National Plan of Integrated Airport Systems for 2017–2021, in which it is categorized as a non-hub primary commercial service facility.

Block Island State Airport is one of six active airports operated by the Rhode Island Airport Corporation, the other five being T.F. Green State Airport, Newport State Airport, North Central State Airport, Quonset State Airport and Westerly State Airport.

Facilities and aircraft

For the 12-month period ending 30 August 2010, the airport had 16,503 aircraft operations, an average of 45 per day: 61% general aviation, 38% air taxi, and <1% military. At that time there were 4 aircraft based at this airport: 75% single-engine and 25% multi-engine.

Airlines and destinations

References

External links
 Block Island State Airport (BID) page from Rhode Island Airport Corp.
 Aerial image as of March 1995 from USGS The National Map
 

Airports in Rhode Island
Transportation buildings and structures in Washington County, Rhode Island
New Shoreham, Rhode Island
1950 establishments in Rhode Island
Airports established in 1950